Ronaldo Souza dos Santos (born December 7, 1979), nicknamed "Jacare", is a Brazilian former professional mixed martial artist, submission grappler and 4th degree Brazilian jiu-jitsu (BJJ) black belt. 

A highly successful BJJ competitor, Souza was a multiple time World champion in coloured belts before becoming a two-time black belt World Champion, ADCC Submission Fighting World Champion, CBJJO World Cup Champion, Brazilian National Champion and European Open Champion.

Souza transitioned to MMA in 2003, competing for UFC from 2013 to 2021. A highly regarded grappler on the world stage, Souza is a former Strikeforce Middleweight Champion, and has also formerly competed for DREAM and Jungle Fight.

Background
Souza was born in Vila Velha, Brazil, into a cafuzo family and was raised in Cariacica, Brazil. Souza had a rough upbringing, and on the day he turned 15, he saw one of his good friends get shot to death. After this event, Souza's mother moved him to Manaus to go and live with his brother and he started training in Judo and Brazilian jiu-jitsu when he was 17. He is an eight-time World Jiu-Jitsu Champion, including gold medals in the Openweight class in 2003, 2004 and 2005. His other credentials include the 2005 77–87 kg ADCC Champion and the 2005 ADCC Absolute Division runner-up, only losing to Roger Gracie who outweighed him by approximately 25 lbs.  Along with Roger Gracie and Marcelo Garcia, Souza is widely considered to be among the greatest BJJ practitioners of his time.

Mixed martial arts career

Early career
Souza made his mixed martial arts debut on September 9, 2003, at Jungle Fights inaugural event where he lost to Jorge "Macaco" Patino by KO at 3:13 into the first round. He returned to mixed martial arts eight months later at Jungle Fight 2 securing a submission win over Victor Babkir under a minute into the first round. His next fight was in April 2006 at Jungle Fight 6 where he got his second win, defeating Alexander Shlemenko by an arm triangle choke submission. He went on to fight twice before the end of 2006, winning both fights by submission during the first round.

In 2006, Souza fought and drew with UFC Hall of Famer Randy Couture in a grappling contest. After the match Souza was invited by Couture to train at his gym. Souza accepted and started training at Xtreme Couture in Las Vegas. Souza's first fight of 2007 was on May 19 with him scoring a submission win due to strikes over veteran Bill Vucick at Gracie Fighting Championships: Evolution. He would next fight twice within a two-week period on September 29 and October 13, scoring two submission wins both within the first round.

DREAM
In 2008, Souza signed with Japanese MMA-promotion DREAM and was scheduled to participate in the 2008 DREAM Middleweight Grand-Prix. In the first round of the tournament, at DREAM 2 on April 29, 2008, he defeated Ian Murphy by a rear-naked choke submission in the first round. This secured him a place in the quarter-finals which took place at DREAM 4 on June 15 where he fought former ICON Sport Middleweight Champion Jason "Mayhem" Miller. The fight went the distance with Souza continuously going for submissions with Miller escaping multiple rear-naked choke, leglock and armbar-attempts while mounting his own offense on the feet. Souza was awarded a unanimous decision victory which secured him a place in the semi-final of the Middleweight Grand-Prix.

In the semi-finals which took place at DREAM 6 on September 23, Souza defeated Zelg Galesic early in the first round by armbar submission. The victory earned him a place in the finals of the tournament and a shot at the DREAM Middleweight Championship against Gegard Mousasi that same night. In the fight Souza was knocked out early in the first round by an upkick as he attempted to dive past Mousasi's guard to land a strike of his own. After participating in the tournament, Souza left Xtreme Couture and went to San Diego to train with Saulo and Xande Ribeiro, before leaving to train with Anderson Silva and André Galvão in preparation for Silva's upcoming bout with Thales Leites at UFC 97 at Black House.

Souza fought in the DREAM Middleweight Championship in a rematch with Jason Miller at DREAM 9 after Gegard Mousasi vacated the title when moving up to Light Heavyweight. The fight was called a no contest due to an illegal kick to the head that opened up a gash on Souza's head.

Strikeforce
Souza made his Strikeforce debut on December 19, 2009, at Strikeforce: Evolution with a first-round submission win over Matt Lindland, via arm-triangle choke. In this fight, Souza showed a major improvement in his stand up game and striking. Souza faced Joey Villaseñor on May 15, 2010, at Strikeforce: Heavy Artillery. He won the fight via unanimous decision, dominating the first round, being very aggressive, achieving the mount position and almost achieving the submission, but slowed down on the 2nd and 3rd round.

Souza fought Tim Kennedy on August 21, 2010, at Strikeforce: Houston for the vacant Strikeforce Middleweight Championship, and won via unanimous decision. Souza then defended the belt for the first time against Robbie Lawler, on January 29, 2011, at Strikeforce: Diaz vs. Cyborg.

In his second defense, Souza lost his Middleweight Championship against American Kickboxing Academy fighter Luke Rockhold via unanimous decision (50–45, 48–47, and 48–47).

On March 3, 2012, Souza made his sixth Strikeforce appearance against late replacement Bristol Marunde. Souza won via arm-triangle choke, submitting Marunde at 2:43 of the final round.

On August 18, 2012, Souza faced Derek Brunson in his seventh Strikeforce appearance. Souza dropped Brunson early with a counter right hand which planted Brunson on the mat and landed three ground strikes, knocking out Brunson in just 41 seconds.

Souza faced UFC veteran Ed Herman at the final Strikeforce card, Strikeforce: Marquardt vs. Saffiedine, on January 12, 2013.  He won via submission in the first round.

Ultimate Fighting Championship
2013
Souza signed a five-fight deal with the UFC in January 2013.

Souza was expected to make his promotional debut against Costas Philippou on May 18, 2013, at UFC on FX 8. Philippou pulled out of the bout in early May, citing a cut above his eye, and was replaced by Chris Camozzi. Souza arm-triangle choked Camozzi unconscious in the first round.

Souza next knocked out Yushin Okami in the first round on September 4, 2013, at UFC Fight Night 28.

2014
Souza beat Francis Carmont by unanimous decision (29–28, 29–28, and 30–27) on February 15, 2014, at UFC Fight Night 36. After, he said he was injured during his training camp and would require a minimum of six weeks for recovery.

Souza was expected to rematch Gegard Mousasi on August 2, 2014, at UFC 176. When the event was cancelled, the bout was rescheduled for September 5, 2014, at UFC Fight Night 50. Souza won via submission in the third round, earning his first Performance of the Night bonus award.

2015
Souza was expected to face Yoel Romero on February 28, 2015, at UFC 184. Souza pulled out of the fight on January 15, due to pneumonia. The bout was rescheduled for April 18, 2015 at UFC on Fox 15. Romero pulled out of the fight a week before the event, citing a ligament and meniscus tear in his knee.
Souza instead rematched returning veteran Chris Camozzi, submitting him with a first-round armbar.

The bout with Romero was scheduled for a third time, eventually taking place on December 12, 2015, at UFC 194. Souza lost the bout via split decision. 12 of 17 media outlets scored the bout in favor of Souza, and 3 of 17 scored it a draw.

2016
Souza faced Vitor Belfort on May 14, 2016, at UFC 198. He won the fight via TKO in the first round and was awarded a Performance of the Night bonus.

Souza was expected to face Luke Rockhold in a rematch on November 27, 2016, at UFC Fight Night 101. However, the pairing was cancelled on November 1, 2016, after Rockhold was ruled out of the contest after sustaining an undisclosed injury. As a result, Souza was removed from the card as well.

2017
Souza faced Tim Boetsch on February 11, 2017, at UFC 208. He won the fight via submission in the first round. The win also earned Souza his third Performance of the Night bonus award.

Souza fought Robert Whittaker on April 15, 2017, at UFC on Fox 24. He lost by second-round TKO. During the event weekend, Souza signed a new, eight-fight deal with UFC.

2018
A rematch with Derek Brunson took place on January 27, 2018, in the main event at UFC on Fox 27. Souza won the fight via TKO in the first round. This win earned him the Performance of the Night bonus.

Souza faced Kelvin Gastelum  on May 12, 2018, at UFC 224. He lost the fight via split decision. The fight also received Fight of the Night honors.

Souza was expected to face David Branch on November 3, 2018, at UFC 230. However, on October 19, 2018, It was reported that Souza replaced injured Luke Rockhold  to face Chris Weidman in the event. He won the fight via knockout in the third round. Both fighters earned Fight of the Night honors.

2019
Souza was scheduled to face Yoel Romero on April 27, 2019, at UFC on ESPN 3. However, it was reported in early April that Romero pulled out of the bout due to illness. Souza remained on the card and faced Jack Hermansson in the main event at UFC Fight Night: Jacaré vs. Hermansson. He lost the fight by unanimous decision.

Souza moved up to the Light Heavyweight division and  faced  Jan Błachowicz on November 16, 2019, at UFC Fight Night 164. He would lose the fight by split decision.

2020
Souza was scheduled to face Uriah Hall for a middleweight bout on April 18, 2020, at UFC 249. However, on April 9, Dana White, the president of UFC announced that this event was postponed and the bout and event were rescheduled for May 9, 2020. On May 8, Souza had to withdraw from the fight after testing positive for COVID-19.

Souza was expected to face Marvin Vettori on December 12, 2020, at UFC 256. However, the bout was scrapped when it was revealed Vettori would be serving as a late replacement to face Jack Hermansson at UFC on ESPN 19 and Souza instead faced Kevin Holland. He lost the fight via knockout in the first round.

2021
Souza faced André Muniz on May 15, 2021, at UFC 262. He lost the fight via technical submission in the first round after his arm snapped while trapped in an armbar. Souza underwent surgery to repair his right humerus. The bout was the last of his prevailing contract, making him a free agent after the organization did not re-sign Souza.

On August 10, 2021, Souza announced that he was retiring from MMA, hinting at a return to BJJ.

Boxing career
Souza was booked to compete in his boxing debut against fellow MMA veteran Vitor Belfort at Gamebred Boxing 4 on April 1, 2023.

Personal life
Souza and his wife, Larissa Carvalho, have three children.

On October 8, 2020, Souza revealed the plans to start his own BJJ Academy in Orlando, Florida. In 2022, he expressed plans for a debut in boxing.

Championships and accomplishments
Brazilian jiu-jitsu and submission grappling
Main Achievements (Black Belt):ADCC Submission Wrestling World Championship:
ADCC 2011 Superfight Runner-up (against Braulio Estima)
ADCC 2009 Superfight Champion (against Robert Drysdale)
ADCC 2005 77 – 87 kg: 1st Place
ADCC 2005 Openweight: 2nd Place
ADCC 2003 77 – 87 kg: 2nd Place
ADCC 2003 Brazilian Qualifiers 77 – 87 kg: 1st PlaceIBJJF World Championship:
2005 Black Belt Medium Heavy: 1st Place
2005 Black Belt Open Weight: 1st Place
2004 Black Belt Medium Heavy: 2nd Place
2004 Black Belt Open Weight: 1st PlaceCBJJO World Cup:
2005 Black belt: 2nd place
2004 Black belt: 1st placeIBJJF Pan American Championship:
2004 Black Belt Medium Heavy: 1st Place
2004 Black Belt Open Weight: 1st PlaceIBJJF European Open Championship:
2005 Black Belt Medium Heavy: 1st Place
2005 Black Belt Open Weight: 2nd Place

Main Achievements (Colored Belts):IBJJF World Championship:
2003 Brown Belt Medium Heavy: 1st Place
2003 Brown Belt Open Weight: 1st Place
2002 Brown Belt Medium Heavy: 1st Place
2002 Brown Belt Open Weight: 2nd Place
2001 Purple Belt Middle: 1st Place
2001 Purple Belt Open Weight: 1st PlaceCBJJ Brazilian National Championship:
2004 Brown Belt Medium Heavy: 1st Place

Mixed martial artsUltimate Fighting ChampionshipFight of the Night (Two times) 
Performance of the Night (Four times) 
Submission of the Night (One time) StrikeforceStrikeforce Middleweight Championship (One time)
One successful title defenseDREAM2008 DREAM Middleweight Grand Prix Runner-upSherdog'
2014 All-Violence Third Team

Mixed martial arts record

|-
|Loss
|align=center|26–10 (1)
|André Muniz
|Technical Submission (armbar)
|UFC 262
|
|align=center|1
|align=center|3:59
|Houston, Texas, United States
|
|-
|Loss
|align=center|26–9 (1)
|Kevin Holland
|KO (punches)
|UFC 256
|
|align=center|1
|align=center|1:45
|Las Vegas, Nevada, United States
|
|-
|Loss
|align=center|26–8 (1)
|Jan Błachowicz
|Decision (split)
|UFC Fight Night: Błachowicz vs. Jacaré 
|
|align=center|5
|align=center|5:00
|São Paulo, Brazil
|
|-
|Loss
|align=center|26–7 (1)
|Jack Hermansson
|Decision (unanimous)
|UFC Fight Night: Jacaré vs. Hermansson 
|
|align=center|5
|align=center|5:00
|Sunrise, Florida, United States
|
|-
|Win
|align=center|26–6 (1)
|Chris Weidman
|KO (punches)
|UFC 230 
|
|align=center|3
|align=center|2:46
|New York City, New York, United States
|
|-
|Loss
|align=center|25–6 (1)
|Kelvin Gastelum
|Decision (split)
|UFC 224
|
|align=center|3
|align=center|5:00
|Rio de Janeiro, Brazil
|
|-
|Win
|align=center|25–5 (1)
|Derek Brunson
|KO (head kick and punches)
|UFC on Fox: Jacaré vs. Brunson 2 
|
|align=center|1
|align=center|3:50
|Charlotte, North Carolina, United States
|
|-  
|Loss
|align=center|24–5 (1)
|Robert Whittaker
|TKO (head kick and punches)
|UFC on Fox: Johnson vs. Reis
|
|align=center|2
|align=center|3:28
|Kansas City, Missouri, United States
|
|-
|Win
|align=center|24–4 (1)
|Tim Boetsch
|Submission (kimura)
|UFC 208
|
|align=center|1
|align=center|3:41
|Brooklyn, New York, United States
|
|-
|Win
|align=center|23–4 (1)
|Vitor Belfort
|TKO (punches)
|UFC 198
|
|align=center|1
|align=center|4:38
|Curitiba, Brazil
|
|-
| Loss
| align=center| 22–4 (1)
| Yoel Romero
| Decision (split)
| UFC 194
| 
| align=center|3
| align=center|5:00
| Las Vegas, Nevada, United States
| 
|-
| Win
| align=center| 22–3 (1)
| Chris Camozzi
|Submission (armbar)
| UFC on Fox: Machida vs. Rockhold 
| 
| align=center| 1
| align=center| 2:33
| Newark, New Jersey, United States
|
|-
| Win
| align=center| 21–3 (1)
| Gegard Mousasi
| Submission (guillotine choke)
| UFC Fight Night: Jacaré vs. Mousasi
| 
| align=center| 3
| align=center| 4:30 
| Mashantucket, Connecticut, United States
| 
|-
| Win
| align=center| 20–3 (1)
| Francis Carmont
| Decision (unanimous)
| UFC Fight Night: Machida vs. Mousasi
| 
| align=center| 3
| align=center| 5:00
| Jaraguá do Sul, Brazil
| 
|-
| Win
| align=center| 19–3 (1)
| Yushin Okami
| TKO (punches)
| UFC Fight Night: Teixeira vs. Bader
| 
| align=center| 1
| align=center| 2:47
| Belo Horizonte, Brazil
| 
|-
| Win
| align=center| 18–3 (1)
| Chris Camozzi
| Technical Submission (arm-triangle choke)
| UFC on FX: Belfort vs. Rockhold
| 
| align=center| 1
| align=center| 3:37
| Jaraguá do Sul, Brazil
| 
|-
| Win
| align=center| 17–3 (1)
| Ed Herman
| Submission (kimura)
| Strikeforce: Marquardt vs. Saffiedine
| 
| align=center| 1
| align=center| 3:10
| Oklahoma City, Oklahoma, United States
| 
|-
| Win
| align=center| 16–3 (1)
| Derek Brunson
| KO (punches)
| Strikeforce: Rousey vs. Kaufman
| 
| align=center| 1
| align=center| 0:41
| San Diego, California, United States
| 
|-
| Win
| align=center| 15–3 (1)
| Bristol Marunde
| Submission (arm-triangle choke)
| Strikeforce: Tate vs. Rousey
| 
| align=center| 3
| align=center| 2:43
| Columbus, Ohio, United States
| 
|-
| Loss
| align=center| 14–3 (1)
| Luke Rockhold
| Decision (unanimous)
| Strikeforce: Barnett vs. Kharitonov
| 
| align=center| 5
| align=center| 5:00
| Cincinnati, Ohio, United States
| 
|-
| Win
| align=center| 14–2 (1)
| Robbie Lawler
| Submission (rear-naked choke)
| Strikeforce: Diaz vs. Cyborg
| 
| align=center| 3
| align=center| 2:00
| San Jose, California, United States
| 
|-
| Win
| align=center| 13–2 (1)
| Tim Kennedy
| Decision (unanimous)
| Strikeforce: Houston
| 
| align=center| 5
| align=center| 5:00
| Houston, Texas, United States
| 
|-
| Win
| align=center| 12–2 (1)
| Joey Villaseñor
| Decision (unanimous)
| Strikeforce: Heavy Artillery
| 
| align=center| 3
| align=center| 5:00
| St. Louis, Missouri, United States
| 
|-
| Win
| align=center| 11–2 (1)
| Matt Lindland
| Submission (arm-triangle choke)
| Strikeforce: Evolution
| 
| align=center| 1
| align=center| 4:18
| San Jose, California, United States
| 
|-
| NC
| align=center| 10–2 (1)
| Jason Miller
| NC (cut)
| DREAM 9
| 
| align=center| 1
| align=center| 2:33
| Yokohama, Japan
| 
|-
| Loss
| align=center| 10–2
| Gegard Mousasi
| KO (upkick)
| Dream 6: Middleweight Grand Prix 2008 Final Round
| 
| align=center| 1
| align=center| 2:15
| Saitama, Japan
| 
|-
| Win
| align=center| 10–1
| Zelg Galešić
| Submission (armbar)
| Dream 6: Middleweight Grand Prix 2008 Final Round
| 
| align=center| 1
| align=center| 1:27
| Saitama, Japan
|
|-
| Win
| align=center| 9–1
| Jason Miller
| Decision (unanimous)
| Dream 4: Middleweight Grand Prix 2008 Second Round
| 
| align=center| 2
| align=center| 5:00
| Yokohama, Japan
| 
|-
| Win
| align=center| 8–1
| Ian Murphy
| Submission (rear-naked choke)
| Dream 2: Middleweight Grand Prix 2008 First Round
| 
| align=center| 1
| align=center| 3:37
| Saitama, Japan
| 
|-
| Win
| align=center| 7–1
| Wendell Santos
| TKO (submission to punches)
| Hero's The Jungle
| 
| align=center| 1
| align=center| 1:40
| Manaus, Brazil
| 
|-
| Win
| align=center| 6–1
| José de Ribamar
| Submission (armbar)
| Amazon Challenge
| 
| align=center| 1
| align=center| 3:28
| Manaus, Brazil
| 
|-
| Win
| align=center| 5–1
| Bill Vucick
| TKO (submission to punches)
| Gracie Fighting Championships: Evolution
| 
| align=center| 1
| align=center| 3:01
| Columbus, Ohio, United States
| 
|-
| Win
| align=center| 4–1
| Haim Gozali
| Submission (rear-naked choke)
| Jungle Fight Europe
| 
| align=center| 1
| align=center| 1:34
| Ljubljana, Slovenia
| 
|-
| Win
| align=center| 3–1
| Alexey Prokofiev
| Submission (triangle choke)
| Fury Fighting Championship 1
| 
| align=center| 1
| align=center| 2:30
| São Paulo, Brazil
| 
|-
| Win
| align=center| 2–1
| Alexander Shlemenko
| Technical Submission (arm-triangle choke)
| Jungle Fight 6
| 
| align=center| 1
| align=center| 2:10
| Manaus, Brazil
| 
|-
| Win
| align=center| 1–1
| Victor Babkir
| TKO (submission to punches)
| Jungle Fight 2
| 
| align=center| 1
| align=center| 0:56
| Manaus, Brazil
| 
|-
| Loss
| align=center| 0–1
| Jorge Patino
| KO (punch)
| Jungle Fight 1
| 
| align=center| 1
| align=center| 3:13
| Manaus, Brazil
|

Boxing record

See also
 List of male mixed martial artists
 List of Brazilian Jiu-Jitsu practitioners

References

External links
 

Living people
1979 births
Brazilian male mixed martial artists
Middleweight mixed martial artists
Mixed martial artists utilizing judo
Mixed martial artists utilizing Brazilian jiu-jitsu
Strikeforce (mixed martial arts) champions
Brazilian people of indigenous peoples descent
Brazilian practitioners of Brazilian jiu-jitsu
People awarded a black belt in Brazilian jiu-jitsu
Brazilian male judoka
Brazilian submission wrestlers
People from Vila Velha
Ultimate Fighting Championship male fighters
World Brazilian Jiu-Jitsu Championship medalists
Sportspeople from Espírito Santo
Brazilian jiu-jitsu practitioners who have competed in MMA (men)